Verdet may refer to:

 People
 Émile Verdet (1824–1866), French physicist
 Ilie Verdeț (1925–2001), Romanian politician
 Jean-Pierre Verdet (born 1932), French astronomer and historian of astronomy

 Wine grape varieties
 Arbois (grape)
 Gouais blanc